Sussex Downs Conservation Board was an English local government organisation based in East and West Sussex to promote and manage the Sussex Downs Area of Outstanding Natural Beauty. In March 2010 the status of the AONB was revoked and the management of the Sussex Downs AONB was merged with the East Hampshire AONB under the South Downs Joint Committee pending the formation of a national park authority. On the 1 April 2011 the South Downs National Park was established under the South Downs National Park Authority.

References 

[add in East Sussex]

Local government in West Sussex